Sili may refer to:

 Sili Province, a province of ancient China
 Sili, Samoa, a village in Samoa
 Sili (Olosega), a village in American Samoa
 Sili, the Welsh name of the following places in Wales:
 Sully, Vale of Glamorgan, a village
 Sully Island
 Sili Bank, a Chinese company

People with the name 
 Liang Sili (1924–2016), Chinese rocket scientist
 Wei Sili (654–719), official of the Tang Dynasty

See also 
 Silly (disambiguation)
 Silli block, in India